is a military base of the Japan Ground Self-Defense Force, located in Gotemba, Shizuoka prefecture, Japan. It is one of several military facilities located in the foothills of Mount Fuji.

History
Camp Itazuma was established in April 1909 by the Imperial Japanese Army as a training facility. After the end of World War II, it came under the control of the 25th Infantry Division of the United States Army in Japan, and was renamed “Middle Camp”.

In 1962, after the conclusion of the Treaty of Mutual Cooperation and Security between the United States and Japan, the base was returned to the control of the Japanese government and reestablished as a training facility for the post-war Japan Ground Self-Defense Force. It has been home to the JGSDF 34th Infantry Regiment, which has been active in various disaster relief operations throughout Japan since that time.

External links
Japan Self-Defense Force home page 

Itazuma
Itazuma 
Military installations established in 1909
1909 establishments in Japan
Gotemba, Shizuoka